George Town is a neighbourhood in Chennai (formerly Madras), Tamil Nadu, India. It is near the Fort Saint George, Chennai. It is also known as Muthialpet and Parry's corner. It is an historical area of Chennai city from where its expansion began in the 1640s. It extends from the Bay of Bengal in the east to Park town on the west. The Fort St. George is on the south, to Royapuram in the north. The Fort St. George houses the Tamil Nadu Legislative Assembly and the Secretariat. The High court of Tamil Nadu at Chennai, Dr. Ambedkar Law College, Stanley Medical College and Hospital are located here.

History

During the colonial period, the area in and around Muthialpet was renamed as "George Town" by the British in 1911, in honour of King George V when he was crowned as the Emperor of India. George Town is one of the names used for Muthialpet. It has the landmark 'Parry building', after which the locality is called 'Parry's Corner'. The area is also called Broadway, named after a main thoroughfare in Muthialpet.

The first settlement of the city of Madras began here, near the fort. Fort St George  began in 1640 as a fortified warehouse for the English East India Company. It was built by Francis Day. The township of native people that began to grow up around it was called the Black Town by the British. As the city grew, this area became the base for development and construction activities, meeting the needs of people for their livelihood and rulers' administrative comforts. With the construction of one of India's major ports in the area, Madras became an important naval base for the British.

By the early 18th century, growing population and commercial activities resulted in expansion to neighbouring areas. In 1733, the weaving community started to settle down in Chintadripet and Collepetta near Tiruvottiyur, since abundant open space was available for weaving. The community of washermen in the Mint area then moved towards the west, forming the present Washermanpet. Potters from this area moved outside the Fort on the north side and formed a new colony named Kosapet. With the construction of a bridge in 1710 to connect Egmore, people started moving towards the present Moore Market area.

When the French occupied Madras in 1746 and returned it to the English in 1749 in exchange for Quebec by the Treaty of Aix-la-Chapelle, the English flattened a part of Black Town in order to have a clear field for fire in the event of a future attack. In 1773, the English erected 13 pillars along the flattened area of the Black Town and banned construction in any form between the pillars and the fort which would otherwise block the view of possible invaders. Soon a new township, known as the new Black Town, came up beyond these pillars and the old Black Town gave way to the Madras High Court. A thoroughfare was formed along the stretch between the pillars and the high court which later became the China Bazaar Road. The only surviving one of the 13 pillars is being maintained in the compound of the Parry's building.

In 1772, the first organised water supply of Madras began with the Seven Wells Scheme. On one occasion, Mysore ruler Hyder Ali's troops even tried to poison the water source one night.

In the following centuries, High Court buildings and first light house tower with architectural beauty came up in an area where an old Hindu temple of Sri Chenna Kesava perumal  and Chenna Malleswara swamy  existed. This temple was demolished and later shifted to the present place near Mint Street on Nethaji Subhash Chandra Bose Road and is popular amongst Hindus as Pattanam Koil.

Several Tamil refugees from Burma, who fled Myanmar during the early sixties, arrived in George Town. In 1969, the Burma Bazaar, a market selling imported foreign goods in shops on pavements, was established by these Burmese refugees-turned-entrepreneurs.

Religions and holy shrines

George Town has a rich congregation of shrines of different faiths within its boundaries. The first Hindu temples of British Madras were built in this neighbourhood between 1640 and 1680. Many of the temples were built since then by the leading merchants of the city, mostly dubashes (middlemen) of British merchants and business establishments. Several of the streets in the neighbourhood are named after these dubashes.

The city's first Jain temples were built in the central part of the western half of the neighbourhood occupied by settlers from Rajasthan and Saurashtra, now known as Sowcarpet. Today, festivals such as Holi, Diwali, and Ganesh Chathurthi are celebrated in the North Indian style.

The first mosque in the neighbourhood was built in the 1670s on Moor Street. The mosque, however, does not exist today. The oldest surviving mosque is the huge Masjid Mamoor in Angappa Naicken Street, which was built in the eighteenth century.

The first Madras Synagogue was built in Coral Merchant Street, which had a large presence of Portuguese Paradesi Jews in the sixteenth, seventeenth and eighteenth centuries. The Madras Synagogue doesn't exist today, but there is said to be a "handful" of Jews (not including people with Jewish lineage) in Madras city today.

The oldest church is the Armenian Church on Armenian Street. The Cathedral of St Mary of the Angels located next to the church has its presence since 1642. However, the first Catholic place of worship in the neighbourhood was built before the St. Mary's cathedral. Protestant churches, however, were built only in the nineteenth century, with the first English Protestant Church built in 1810 on Davidson Street.

The Muthialpet area, the western part of George Town extending northwards from the Madras High Court, is one of the 163 notified areas (megalithic sites) in the state of Tamil Nadu.

Demographics
Residents of George Town in earlier days were mainly Telugus with sizable population of Tamils. In the core area, streets are named after Telugu people such as Govindappa Naick, Angappa Naick, Adiyappa Naick, Narayana Mudali, Kasi Chetty, Rasappa Chetty, Varada Muthiappan, Thatha Muthiappan, Kondi Chetty, Linghi Chetty, Thambu Chetty, and so forth. A major part of trade and business was in the hands of Telugus. Apart from locals, people from other parts of the country as well as foreign nationals who had trade and business links with the 'British East India Company' were living in this area. Many of the streets bear the name of the business that people in the locality were engaged in. Men who were doing business in corals lived together in Coral Merchants Street (பவழக்கார தெரு) and people from Armenia (a former state of Russia) doing business with the English were living in Armenian Street (அரண்மனைக்காரர் தெரு). A church called Armenian Church was also constructed in the same area for them. As the town was developing manifold, people from all over India settled here doing business in all fields, chiefly from Rajasthan, Gujarat, Maharashtra and Uttar Pradesh. The area occupied by the North Indians, chiefly Marwaris from Rajasthan and Gujarat, in the twentieth century came to be known as Sowcarpet (literally 'area of the rich', derived from the word 'sahukar' meaning money lender in Hindi).

Geography 
George Town extends roughly from Chennai Central railway station and People's Park in the west to the Bay of Bengal in the east. To the north is Basin Bridge and Royapuram while Fort St George bounds it on the south. Prakasam Salai (Broadway), originally Popham's Broadway, divided George Town into two portions, the eastern part of which was historically known as Muthialpet and the western past, Peddanaickenpet.

Roads and streets

Major roads of the neighbourhood include Netaji Subash Chandra Bose Road (popularly known as China Bazaar Road), Rajaji Salai (formerly First Line Beach road) and Wall Tax Road. The streets are generally small and narrow with several lanes branching out of them. The longest street is Mint Street, which starts near Central Railway Station making way across the neighbourhood for about 4 km towards north and ends near Vallalar Nagar. The street derived its name from a mint of the East India Company that existed at the end of this street during the British era. Now the building houses Central Printing Press of Government of Tamil Nadu. This is considered one of few longest streets in the world. Several government offices, both state and central governments, including Andaman & Nicobar Island government's administrative offices of Shipping and Tourism Departments, are located on Rajaji Salai. The very attractive Burma Bazaar, noted for selling electronic goods and other items at cheaper rates, once mostly run by Burmese refugees, is also located on this road.

Parry's Corner

Parry's Corner is a neighborhood in George Town. Often referred to as Parry's, it is situated near the Chennai Port, at the intersection of North Beach Road and NSC Bose Road. It is named after Thomas Parry, a  Welsh merchant who set up the EID Parry Company in 1787, the corporate headquarters of which stand on the corner.

The place is an important center for commercial banking and trading, and also a major hub for the intracity bus service. It is one of the most congested areas in the city. The area has many popular schools like St. Mary's Anglo-Indian Higher Secondary School, St. Columban's Anglo-Indian Higher Secondary School. The Anderson Church is the oldest and most prominent church in the region.

Streets and specialities
Several streets in the neighbourhood is known for their dedicated businesses and services. The following table lists some of the streets and the chief services they are known for.

Architecture
Being one of the oldest settlements in the modern city of Chennai, George Town remains a classic example of a confluence of different architectural styles. The neighbourhood is known for several classic styles of buildings such as Indo-Saracenic, Neoclassical, Gothic, and Art Deco, apart from several traditional vernacular styles. Each building presents its uniqueness in its architectural character. Dare House in Parrys Corner, an Art Deco–style building, for instance, sports an emphasis on vertical lines and a distinct design of a 'sunburst jaali' for ventilation.

Buildings and landmarks
This area has many heritage and modern buildings on Rajaji salai and NSC Bose Road. Heritage buildings include the High Court Buildings, the Old Lighthouse Tower and the Law College building at Parry's Corner and the GPO building and Reserve Bank of India Building on Rajaji Salai. Other modern buildings are Parry's Dare House, the State Bank of Mysore Building, the New Collectorate Office Building (Singaravelar Maaligai), Kuralagam, and the BSNL office buildings. Raja Annamalai Mandram is a big hall where indoor meetings, cultural activities and dramas are held. In addition, there are lot of buildings owned by business community and government.

Land use
The land use in George Town primarily comprises residential and mixed-residential zones. It is classified as a 'continuous building area', permitting structures of ground-plus-one floor, with a floor space index of 1.5. As of 2014, the business district has more than 14,000 buildings with around 25,000 property tax assessees.

All buildings in George Town have been found in violation of development regulations, with several buildings found to have been constructed without obtaining building approval from the corporation.

Economy

George Town is the birthplace of the economy of the city that began to flourish in the 17th century. Being the primary neighbourhood of the then burgeoning city of Madras, George Town houses several commercial establishments of national importance. It long housed the central business district of the city, until the 1960s, when it began to drift towards the south to reach the Gemini circle.

Banking

The neighbourhood and the surrounding areas were home to several Nattukottai Chettiars or Nagarathars, who offered banking services to the public in the city before the establishment of modern commercial banks. They both offered loans to and accepted money deposits from the public, besides offering loans to the agricultural labourers. Several banking and financial offices were housed in heritage structures from the Colonial era, clustered chiefly around North Beach Road, many of which continue to exist to the present day.

The first European-style banking system in India was started in George Town with the establishment of the 'Madras Bank' on 21 June 1683, almost a century before the establishment of the first commercial banks, such as the Bank of Hindustan and the General Bank of India, which were established in 1770 and 1786, respectively. However, the bank proved a failure. Upon the recommendation of the British Finance Committee on the formation of a government bank, the Madras Bank, then known as the 'Government Bank', started functioning again from 1806. In 1843, the bank merged with the Carnatic Bank (1788), the British Bank of Madras (1795) and the Asiatic Bank (1804) and became the Bank of Madras, which was one of the three Presidency banks of India. In 1921, it merged with the other two Presidency banks, namely the Bank of Bengal and the Bank of Bombay, to form the Imperial Bank of India, which later became the State Bank of India in 1955. The neighbourhood is also home to the south zonal office of the Reserve Bank of India, the country's central bank.

Transportation
George Town remains the geographical and geometrical focal point of Chennai where all the radial roads and railroads of the city converge. The arterial roads, namely, North and South Beach Roads, Anna Salai, Poonamallee High Road, Grand Northern Trunk Road, and Ennore High Road radiate from the neighbourhood, and both the primary terminal railway stations of the city, namely, Chennai Central and Chennai Beach borders the western and eastern sides of the neighbourhood. In addition to the two terminal stations, many suburban railway stations are located circumferentially around the neighbourhood, namely, Chennai Central Suburban, Chennai Fort, Chennai Park and Park Town, all located in the south and southwest fringes, Basin Bridge Junction at the western fringe, and Royapuram railway station at the northern fringe. The neighbourhood has a bus terminus, the Broadway Bus Stand near Parry's Corner.

The intercity and interstate express bus terminus originally functioned at the Broadway terminus near Madras High Court in an area covering about 1.5 acres. With increasing transportation needs, the terminus was shifted to the new premises covering 36.5 acres at Koyambedu in 2002 constructed at a cost of  1,030 million.

In January 2013, further to the public interest litigation petition filed in the court, the Corporation decided to improve the Broadway bus terminus at an estimated cost of  33.6 million.

Education

Colleges and universities

George Town is home to various government-run colleges and institutions. Dr. Ambedkar Law College, initially known as Madras Law College, was established in 1891. The medical college of the Government Stanley Medical College and Hospital was established in 1938 although the hospital was established by the turn of the 19th century. The Government Dental College and Hospital was established in 1953. Bharathi Women's College is located in the northern side of the neighbourhood.

Primary and secondary schools
It has many premier schools which includes St. Mary's Anglo-Indian Higher Secondary School, St Francis Xavier Anglo-Indian Hr secondary school, St. Columban's Anglo-Indian Higher Secondary School and other schools including The Muthialpet Higher Secondary School, St.Gabriel's Higher Secondary School, Ramiah Girls High School, MEASI Matriculation Higher Secondary School, Muthialpet Girls School, Bishop Corrie Higher Secondary School and Dominic Savio School.

Developments
Although George Town is the origin of the modern city of Chennai and remained the chief commercial hub of the city till the early 20th century, the city's central business district gradually moved towards the south since the mid-20th century, presently lying at the Gemini Circle on Anna Salai. This resulted in paucity of development funds for the northern region of the city. However, some of the community-specific areas of George Town, such as Sowcarpet where the prosperous Marwari community resides, still remains an important commercial hub of the city.

Political awareness
Political awareness among citizens of George Town is very high. Almost all leaders of national and state political parties used to hold street meetings contacting people and propagating their aims and principles. Leaders such as C. N. Annadurai, K. Kamaraj, C. Rajagopalachary, E. V. K. Ramaswamy Naicker, M. P. Sivagnanam (Ma. Po. Si), Andhra leaders such as T. Prakasam and also Mahatma Gandhi, Annie Besant and many others did not miss this part of the city. With huge immigrant population settled here, not only local and state politics but also politics of all other states of the country and even foreign nations are well known here. All political parties make it a point to be in good books of the citizens. The DMK party, one of the chief political parties of Tamil Nadu, counts Coral Merchant Street as its birthplace in 1949.

Location in context

See also

 Timeline of Chennai history
 History of Chennai

References

External links

History of Fort St George and Georgetown
 Sowcarpet/Mint Street

Neighbourhoods in Chennai
Coastal neighbourhoods of Chennai